Edwin P. Fischer (October 3, 1872 – 1947) was an American male tennis player who was active in the late 19th century.

Biography
Edwin Fischer won the mixed doubles title at the U.S. National Championships four times. In 1894, 1895 and 1896, he won the title with Juliette Atkinson, and in 1898, he won his fourth title partnering Carrie Neely. The mixed doubles championship was played at the Philadelphia Cricket Club.

His best result in the men's singles competition came in 1896 when he reached the semifinals in which he was beaten by Bill Larned. In 1897, he again was defeated by Larned, this time in the quarterfinals.

In July 1896, he won the Tuxedo tournament in New York City, defeating 1894 and 1895 champion Malcolm Chace. Fischer was a three-times finalist at the Canadian Championships in 1896, 1897 and 1906. He was a runner-up at the 1906 indoor national tennis championship in New York.

His highest ranking in U.S. singles was no. 5 in 1896, and he was ranked in the top 10 during four years.

Wall Street bombing
At noon on September 16, 1920, a bomb exploded on Wall Street in the Financial District of New York City. The blast killed 38 and seriously injured 143.

Investigators of the Wall Street bombing became suspicious of Edwin Fischer as he apparently predicted the attack with astonishing accuracy. Fischer had been warning his friends of an impending bomb attack on Wall Street, sending them postcards urging them to leave the area before September 16.

He was taken into custody in Hamilton, Ontario. On return to New York, he was wearing two business suits for warmth and a tennis outfit underneath, which he claimed he wore "to be ready for a tennis match at all times". The police questioned him at Bellevue. He said he had received the messages "through the air from God." Realizing Fischer was suffering from a mental disorder and finding that he made a regular habit of issuing such warnings, the police released him and had him committed to the Amityville Asylum where he was diagnosed as 'insane but harmless'.

Grand Slam finals

Mixed doubles (4 titles)

References

1872 births
1947 deaths
19th-century American people
19th-century male tennis players
American male tennis players
Tennis people from New York (state)
United States National champions (tennis)
Grand Slam (tennis) champions in mixed doubles
Date of death missing